Heaven's Gate, a phrase made familiar from William Shakespeare's Sonnet 29, which begins "When in disgrace with fortune and men's eyes", may refer to:

 Heaven's Gate (religious group), mostly known for a mass suicide in 1997
 Heaven's Gate (film), a 1980 American film directed by Michael Cimino
 Heavens Gate (band), a German heavy metal band
 Heaven's Gate (album), a 2007 album by Norwegian symphonic power metal band Keldian
 Heaven's Gate (video game), a 3D fighting game
 Heaven's Gate, an unofficial live album by the band UFO from 1995
 "Heaven's Gate", a song by Zion I from Break a Dawn
 "Heaven's Gate", a song by Burna Boy from Outside 
 The pearly gates, informal name for the gateway to Heaven in Christian beliefs
 Tianmen Cave, a very large, natural hole near the top of Tianmen Mountain in Hunan, China
 Heaven's Gate, an album and single by American artist Nero's Day at Disneyland

See also
 "The Worms at Heaven's Gate", a poem by Wallace Stevens
 Gates of Heaven (disambiguation)